Crooke is a surname which can refer to the following people:

People

 Alastair Crooke (b. 1950), British diplomat and Middle East expert
 Andrew Crooke (died 1674), London publisher, sometime partner of William Cooke
 Edward Crooke (1861–1940), Australian politician
 Frederick Crooke (1844–1923), English cricketer
 Helkiah Crooke (1576–1648), Court physician to King James I of England, Keeper of Bethlem Royal Hospital (1619–1632)
 Iris Crooke (1895–1985), New Zealand nurse and voluntary aid administrator
 John Crooke (disambiguation)
 Leland Crooke, American stage and film actor
 Michael Crooke (b. 1957), American businessman and academic
 Philip S. Crooke (1810–1881), a United States Republican Congressman from New York
 Ray Crooke (b. 1922), Australian artist
 Samuel Crooke (1575–1649), cleric of the Church of England
 Shenel Crooke (born 1993), sprinter from Saint Kitts and Nevis
 Smedley Crooke (1861–1951), British politician, Member of Parliament (1922–1929, 1931–1945)
 Thomas Crooke (disambiguation)
 William Crooke (disambiguation)

Places

 Crooke, village in County Waterford, Ireland
 Crookhaven, named for Crooke family.

See also 
 Cooke
 Crook (disambiguation)
 Crookes (disambiguation)